The Morrison Hotel was a high rise hotel at the corner of Madison and Clark Streets in the downtown Loop community area of Chicago, Illinois. It was designed by the architectural firm of Holabird & Roche and completed in 1925. The hotel was demolished in 1965 to make room for the First National Bank Building (now Chase Tower).

The hotel was named for Orsemus Morrison, the first coroner in Chicago, who bought the site in 1838 and in 1860 built a three-story hotel with 21 rooms. Destroyed in the Great Chicago Fire of 1871, this was replaced by an eight-story building. In 1915 Harry C. Moir, who had bought the property from Morrison's nephew, built a 21-floor, 500-room hotel designed by Marshall and Fox. The hotel was expanded by 650 rooms in 1918. In 1925 the firm Holabird & Roche further expanded it, adding a 46-story tower. The hotel had 1,800 rooms in 1931. A fourth, 21-story section was then added, bringing the number of rooms to 2,210, but was sold in 1937, becoming the Hotel Chicagoan; in the 1950s this was operated under lease by the Morrison. In 1952 a syndicate bought the Morrison and renovated it.

The 1873 Morrison Hotel housed the Boston Oyster House in its basement. In the skyscraper hotel, the Terrace Casino opened in 1936 with a performance by Sophie Tucker and was an important Big Band venue; the Carousel in the Sky was the world's highest nightclub; the Jockey Club on the first floor was the site of protests by the National Association for the Advancement of Colored People that forced removal of its black jockey statues. Presidents Truman, Eisenhower, and Kennedy and Vice-Presidents Barkley and Nixon stayed at the hotel; boxer Jack Dempsey was also a frequent guest. Gorgeous George was a daily client of the beauty parlor. From 1932 on, the headquarters of the Cook County Democratic machine was on the third floor of the Morrison. Joe "Hold 'Em" Powers spent a world record 16 days on the hotel flagpole in 1927, despite losing six teeth when wind blew him into cables.

In 1931, the Air Line Pilots Association was founded in the hotel's ballroom.

In June of 1937, the hotel served as the location in which the Chicago Herald-Examiner kept the notorious murderer Robert Irwin sequestered while negotiating terms of his surrender to authorities in Manhattan.

At the time of its razing in 1965, it was the tallest building to have ever been demolished anywhere in the world. At the time it was demolished, it was still the tallest hotel in Chicago.

See also
 List of tallest voluntarily demolished buildings

Notes

Former buildings and structures in Chicago
Former skyscrapers
Skyscraper hotels in Chicago
Demolished hotels in Chicago
Hotel buildings completed in 1925
1925 establishments in Illinois
Buildings and structures demolished in 1965
1965 disestablishments in Illinois